|}

The Betfair Stayers' Handicap Hurdle is a Premier Handicap National Hunt hurdle race in Great Britain which is open to horses aged four years or older. It is run at Haydock Park over a distance of about 3 miles and half a furlongs (3 miles and 58 yards, or 4,881 metres). It is a handicap race, and it is scheduled to take place each year in November.

From 2007 to 2016 this race featured the use of Fixed Brush hurdles.  These are based on the French hurdle design, similar to plain fences but lower in height. Unlike the traditional hurdle they are very rigid in construction. In 2017 the race reverted to standard hurdles.

The race was first run in 2005.  It was awarded Grade 3 status in 2011 (such races were rebranded as Premier Handicaps in 2022). 
It has been sponsored by Betfair since its inception and the race title has changed to promote various Betfair websites and promotions. The race is currently run on the same day as the Betfair Chase. Prior to 2018 it was run over distances around 2 miles and 7 furlongs.

Winners
 Weights given in stones and pounds.

See also
 Horse racing in Great Britain
 List of British National Hunt races

References

Racing Post:

National Hunt races in Great Britain
Haydock Park Racecourse
National Hunt hurdle races
Recurring sporting events established in 2005
2005 establishments in England